Lunacy is the seventh studio album by Japanese rock band Luna Sea, released on July 12, 2000. It reached number three on the Oricon Albums Chart, charted for six weeks, and was the band's last studio album before disbanding in late 2000.

Overview 
With only the singles "Gravity" and "Tonight" released, Luna Sea decided to do something unprecedented in the Japanese music industry and held the Premiere of Lunacy 2000 concert. At the Nippon Budokan on May 23, 2000, the band only performed songs from the two singles and the upcoming album.

They then embarked on a sold out two part tour, Brand New Chaos, which included three international shows; two in Hong Kong and one in Taipei. However, on November 8, 2000, two days before the first Hong Kong show, Luna Sea held a press conference in the city and announced they would be "dropping the curtain" after two farewell shows at the Tokyo Dome on December 26 and 27.

Two of Lunacys songs, "Sweetest Coma Again" and "Kiss", feature hip hop disc jockey DJ Krush whom Inoran and Sugizo previously worked with on their solo careers.

The album was remastered and re-released on December 5, 2007, it came with a DVD of the promotional videos for "Gravity", "Tonight" and "Love Song". This version reached number 225 on the Oricon chart.

Lunacy and the band's other seven major label studio albums, up to Luv, were released on vinyl record for the first time on May 29, 2019.

Legacy 
A slightly different version of "Sweetest Coma Again" was used as the theme song for the Japanese dub of the James Bond film The World Is Not Enough, and it appears on the Japanese edition of the movie's soundtrack. It was also covered by Abingdon Boys School for the 2007 Luna Sea Memorial Cover Album -Re:birth-.

"Gravity" was used as the theme song for the Japanese film Another Heaven. It has been covered live by Inoran himself during his solo career, and was also covered by American pop rock singer Marié Digby for her 2009 album Second Home.

"Tonight" was used as the theme song for the WOWOW broadcast of the UEFA Euro 2000. Also it has been covered live by J and Inoran themselves during their solo careers.

Track listing

Personnel 
Luna Sea
Ryuichi – vocals
Sugizo – guitar, violin
Inoran – guitar
J – bass
Shinya – drums, percussion

Other
DJ Krush – turntables on "Sweetest Coma Again" and "Kiss"
Les Yeux – female voice on "Gravity" and "Virgin Mary"
Daisuke Kikuchi – synthesizer, programming
Masahiro Tanaka Strings – strings
Kevin Davy – trumpet on "Kiss"

References 

Luna Sea albums
2000 albums